Otakar Pertold (born in Jaroměř 21 March 1884, died 3 May 1965 in Prague) was Czech Indologist, religious studies historian and ethnologist, generally considered the pioneer of Asian religious studies in Czechoslovakia. From 1934, he was Professor of Religious Studies at Charles University. A member of many learned bodies, he was a prolific author and among English readers is best known for his work on Sri Lanka.

References

External links
 Biography (in Czech)

1884 births
1965 deaths
Czech Indologists